Artemisia marschalliana is a species of flowering plant in the family Asteraceae, native from Europe to Mongolia and the Caucasus. It was first described by Sprengel in 1826. It has been treated as a synonym of Artemisia campestris.

References

marschalliana

Plants described in 1826